Hunted in Holland is a British children's film/crime film from 1961 directed by Derek Williams and starring Sean Scully, Jacques Verbrugge and Sandra Spurr. The script was written Ian Dalrymple and Williams. Hunted in Holland was shot in Eastmancolor.

Plot 
Tim visits his penfriend Piet van Helder in Holland. Piet has a kid sister named Aanike. Tim throws away a raw herring, which lands in the megaphone of a man guiding British tourists in a channel boat. Confused he drops his walking stick into the water. When the children later fishes it up, they discover a valuable diamond bracelet hidden inside. The guide actually belongs to a gang of diamond thieves. Tim conceals the bracelet inside a hollow cheese.

Cast 
Sean Scully - Tim
Walter Randall - The guide
Thom Kelling - van Helder
Jacques Verbrugge - Piet van Helder
Sandra Spurr - Aanike van Helder
Riek Schagen - Mrs. van Helder
Jean Lemaire - Grandpa
John Soer - Man in blue
Paul Ostra - Diamond cutter
Sacco van der Made - Police superintendent
Gerard Doting - Dutch thug
Frans Kokshoorn - Dutch thug            
K. Brouwer - Dutch thug
John Rowden - London crook

Homage 
Hunted in Holland pays homage to Louis Lumière's 1895 silent film L'Arroseur Arrosé, in which a boy steps on the hose that a gardener is using to water his plants, cutting off the water flow. When the gardener tilts the nozzle up to inspect it, the boy releases the hose, causing the water to spray him. In this film Aanike van Helder is the scallywag.

Sources 
Hunted in Holland (1960) at BFI
Hunted in Holland (1961) at The Internet Movie Database

British children's films
British crime films
Children's Film Foundation
1961 films
1960s children's films
1960s British films